Carposina anopta is a moth in the family Carposinidae. It is found on Madeira.

References

Carposinidae
Moths described in 1990